Into the West is a 2005 miniseries produced by Steven Spielberg and DreamWorks, with six two-hour episodes (including commercials). The series was first broadcast in the U.S. on Turner Network Television (TNT) on six Fridays starting on June 10, 2005. It was also shown in the UK on BBC2 and BBC HD from November 4, 2006, and in Canada on CBC Television. The series also aired in the U.S. on AMC during the summer (June/July) and fall (autumn, September/October) of 2012.

The miniseries begins in the 1820s and is told mainly through the third person narration of Jacob Wheeler (Matthew Settle) and Loved By the Buffalo (Joseph M. Marshall III), although episodes outside the direct observation of both protagonists are also shown.  The plot follows the story of two families, one white American and one Native American, as their lives become mingled through the momentous events of American expansion.  The story intertwines real and fictional characters and events spanning the period of expansion of the United States in the American frontier from 1825 to 1890.

The show has a large cast, with about 250 speaking parts.  The series features well-known performers including Josh Brolin, Gary Busey, Michael Spears, Tonantzin Carmelo, Skeet Ulrich, Garrett Wang, Steve Reevis, Rachael Leigh Cook, Wes Studi, Irene Bedard, Alan Tudyk, Christian Kane, Russell Means, Jay Tavare, Keri Russell, Graham Greene, Sean Astin, Beau Bridges, Judge Reinhold, Zahn McClarnon, Tom Berenger, Gil Birmingham, David Paymer,  Raoul Trujillo, Eric Schweig, Lance Henriksen, Simon R. Baker, Tyler Christopher, Tatanka Means, Gordon Tootoosis, Sheila Tousey, Annabella Piugattuk, and Will Patton.

It was filmed in Drumheller, Alberta and Santa Fe, New Mexico.

Episodes

Episode 1: "Wheel to the Stars" 
Growling Bear (Gordon Tootoosis), an elderly Lakota medicine man, has an apocalyptic vision that the buffalo his people rely upon will soon vanish from the prairie and the Lakota will live in square houses. His vision is controversial and his apprentice, Soaring Eagle (Gerald Auger), convinces most of the people to disregard Growling Bear's dark vision. A young boy named White Feather (Chevez Ezaneh) overhears and seeks out the now discredited Growling Bear to learn more about his vision. Before he dies, Growling Bear gives White Feather a necklace symbolizing the Lakota medicine wheel. This necklace is passed on to various characters through the miniseries.

Later, during a buffalo jump hunt led by White Feather's older brothers Running Fox (Matthew Strongeagle) and Dog Star (Pony Boy Osuniga), many people from the village are killed during the stampede, but White Feather is miraculously spared when the spirit of deceased Growling Bear appears to protect him. The tribe renames him Loved by the Buffalo and begin to regard him as a holy man healing people by taking their pain upon himself. This causes Soaring Eagle to become jealous and he tries to undermine Loved by the Buffalo (Simon Baker) by blaming him for an outbreak of pox and then leaving him for dead. Growling Bear appears to Loved by the Buffalo again, teaching him a song to cure the outbreak.

Loved by the Buffalo's sister, Thunder Heart Woman (Sarah Weston), is married off to a white trapper, Thomas Lebeck (Scott Heindl). Loved by the Buffalo gives Thunder Heart Woman the wooden medicine wheel necklace as a parting gift. Dog Star (Michael Spears) and Running Fox (Zahn McClarnon) marry two sisters and begin families, but Loved by the Buffalo realizes that his destiny lies on a different path.

At about the same time, a young wheelwright named Jacob Wheeler (Matthew Settle) is growing discontented with his settled life in the fictional Wheelerton, Virginia, where he and his brothers work as wheelwrights for his grandfather Abraham (Ken Pogue), a veteran of the Battle of Yorktown. When a mountain man named James Fletcher (Will Patton) passes through, he tells Jacob of the wonders of the western frontier and that he will be joining an expedition to the Pacific Ocean led by the famous Jedediah Smith (Josh Brolin) leaving from St. Louis, Jacob decides to leave his family and head west. He convinces his brother Nathan (Alan Tudyk), to come west with him, but another brother, Jethro (Skeet Ulrich), cannot bring himself to leave his home and stays behind.

Once the brothers reach St. Louis, Missouri, they find Fletcher, who rebuffs them. Dejected, Nathan goes into a saloon to drink and gamble, winning a deed to a land claim in the Mexican province of Tejas. Nathan tries to convince Jacob to come with him to Tejas, but Jacob has become determined to become a mountain man and travel to the West with Jedediah Smith. The brothers part company and Jacob heads toward the Rocky Mountains.

Jacob catches up with Fletcher and trapping party captain Jedediah Smith who once again rebuffs him, but he convinces them to take him in. Jacob stitches Smith's scalp after a bear attack and prefers Smith's company rather than fraternizing with a Mojave tribe they trade with for horses in the Sierra Nevada. Eventually he becomes a trusted member of the party. Jacob accompanies Smith's party to California, where they are arrested by the Mexican Capitan de Salamanca (Francesco Quinn) for trespassing and held at the San Gabriel Mission. The party is charged with stealing the horses they bought from the Mojave (a brand is shown). The Mexicans fear that if they are freed, the party will show other Americans how to go to California. Smith negotiates their expulsion, promising they would never return to California under pain of death. On the way back, they return to the Mohave camp and are attacked; many are killed including Fletcher, who guards Smith and Jacob's narrow escape through a cave. Loved by the Buffalo undergoes a Sun Dance.

Thunder Heart Woman's (Tonantzin Carmelo) trapper husband Lebeck is killed in an attack by the Crow, her infant daughter is captured, and she is sold into slavery. Later, Jacob sees her being auctioned off at a trapper rendezvous and attempts to buy her in order to return Thunder Heart Woman to her people. Trapper Johnny Fox (Gary Busey) rifle duels Jacob for the right to purchase her. Jacob is victorious, shooting then stabbing Fox one-handed after being shot in his left forearm. Thunder Heart Woman gives Jacob the wooden medicine wheel necklace as a token of her gratitude. When they return to the tribe, Jacob marries Thunder Heart Woman and begins to live with her family as part of the Lakota tribe.

Running Fox trades for a horsecart, much to the dismay of his brothers, who see white goods as a corruption of Lakota culture. When Loved by the Buffalo sees Jacob repairing the wheel, he is reminded of a vision he had during his Sun Dance in which a wooden wheel smashes a stone wheel. Loved by the Buffalo realizes that the wooden wheel symbolizes the wagon wheels of the whites and that the stone wheel is the medicine wheel of the Lakota culture. Loved by the Buffalo takes Jacob and Thunder Heart Woman to a sacred hilltop where a stone medicine wheel has been erected and tells him about the four great powers that it symbolizes. Loved by the Buffalo leaves the tribe to try to prevent the vision of Growling Bear from coming to pass.

Episode 2: "Manifest Destiny" 
After living among the Lakota people, Jacob decides to take his wife and daughter Margaret Light Shines east to Wheelerton, Virginia. Jacob's family gives Thunder Heart Woman a much colder reception than her family gave him. After living in Wheelerton for a time, Jacob decides to take his family, now including a young son Abraham High Wolf, back west.

This time, Jacob's brother Jethro (Skeet Ulrich) decides to come along. They are also accompanied by Jacob's three young female cousins; Leah Wheeler (Emily Holmes), Rachel Wheeler (Jessica Capshaw), and Naomi Wheeler (Keri Russell). The three girls have been unlucky in love and are lured by the tales of excitement out west.

Meanwhile, Thunder Heart Woman's two oldest brothers, Dog Star and Running Fox argue over whether or not to adopt white technology. The disagreement comes to a boil and the two agree to part ways, splitting the tribe.

After working their way west for several years, the Wheeler clan arrives at Independence, Missouri. Jacob, now with a second son Jacob Junior High Cloud, wants to go west to California or the Oregon country, but Thunder Heart Woman and some of the others wish to remain in Missouri. Jacob eventually convinces the others to go to California and they join a wagon train led by Stephen Hoxie (Beau Bridges) who is a better salesman than a leader. Among the other settlers is a German immigrant preacher named Hobbes (Derek de Lint), a free black family fleeing racial prejudice, and several former mountain men.

The wagon train passage is filled with dangers: Leah Wheeler is thrown from the wagon during the crossing of a river and drowns, and the young son of the black pioneers is killed by stampeding cattle during a thunder storm. But life also continues: Rachel and Naomi take husbands from among the wagon trail guides. Later, while traversing a pass, a wagon breaks free, knocks Rachel down and runs over her leg, causing a severe compound fracture. The leg eventually becomes infected and must be amputated. Preacher Hobbes is the closest thing to a doctor available, but he botches the operation and Rachel dies.

Cholera breaks out, killing the wife of the black pioneer. Those exposed, including Jacob, Thunder Heart Woman, the children, and Jethro must stay behind under quarantine while the main body of the wagon train carries on. Naomi and her husband, who have not been exposed, go on with the others. Jethro is afflicted with symptoms of cholera but recovers, and no new outbreaks occur after Jacob orders that all drinking water be boiled. They rush to catch up with the main body, but find it was attacked by Cheyenne warriors, and all except Naomi were killed.

Naomi, taken into captivity, is sold to Cheyenne chief Prairie Fire (Jay Tavare), who takes her as his wife. The thought of a forced marriage to an Indian is repulsive to Naomi, who has always considered them as barely human savages. She chants nursery rhymes, which put off his amorous advances. In time, she begins to see Prairie Fire in a different light and she grows to become happy in her new life. She eventually gives birth to a son, whom he names One Horn Bull.

Jacob returns to the rest of the wagons, and they are soon attacked. The Indians are fought off, but an arrow is shot through Jacob's upper chest, and he begs to be left behind to recover on his own terms as the trail would kill him faster. After the party leaves, Jacob is rescued by a party led by Running Fox, that stumble across him half-dead. After recovering his strength, Jacob spends several months in the mountains. Haunted by the faces of the children he sent on with his wife and brother, Jacob eventually tries to find them in California. He searches several years for his family but cannot find them, and eventually gives them up for dead.

The Mexican–American War erupts and Jacob joins John C. Frémont's militia to fight the Mexican Army. During a supply stop in one of the settlements, he sees his wife at a distance, but before he can go over to greet her, he sees her and his brother Jethro embrace and kiss. They also have a new child, Cornflower. Dejected that his wife and brother have become romantically involved but not wanting to disrupt their happiness, he decides to leave without making his presence known. Before he goes, he gives the wooden medicine wheel necklace to his young son, who does not realize the man is his father.

Meanwhile, Dog Star and Running Fox are still estranged. The other tribes that have been trading with the whites for rifles, particularly the Crow, have grown stronger, and the Lakota are now at a disadvantage. Seeking guidance, Dog Star visits the stone medicine wheel, where he meets Loved by the Buffalo.  Loved by the Buffalo tells his brother that his lifetime quest is to preserve the traditional ways. The whites at the forts refuse to trade pistols to the Lakota, instead giving them whiskey, and drunkenness soon becomes a problem. Loved by the Buffalo also appears to his brother Running Fox in a vision. Running Fox and Dog Star eventually reconcile and agree to no longer trade for white goods.

Thunder Heart Woman finds the wooden medicine wheel necklace and realizes that her husband is still alive. She feels that it is best not to go after him, but their daughter Margaret Light Shines Wheeler (Sage Galesi) is determined to find him.

Episode 3: "Dreams and Schemes" 
Jethro and Thunder Heart Woman remain together in California and a daughter, Corn Flower (Chantelle Webster), is born to them.  While working at the Wheeler ranch, now dubbed Rancho Paradiso, Jethro encounters a 49er named Martin Jarrett (Sean Astin) who brings him the first news about the California gold rush.  Jethro soon follows him to the nearby American River to prospect for gold, although he returns home each night.

Jethro dreams of quick riches but all he finds are a few small grains. Undeterred, he begins to spend more and more time looking for gold.  Without Jethro's labor, the ranch begins to run into difficulties, with essential repairs being left undone.  Jethro also takes to drinking heavily to counter the frigid waters of the river and becomes abusive towards Thunder Heart Woman and the children.  After one too many arguments turn violent, Abe High Wolf Wheeler (Tyler Posey) decides to leave.

Jethro's cousin, David Wheeler (Balthazar Getty), arrives as a 49er and becomes Jethro's partner in prospecting for gold.  Angered by the successes of a group of Chinese immigrant miners, Jethro and David drive them off and steal their claim.  After finding a huge nugget of gold, Jethro and David argue over how they will split their new fortune.  After Jethro falls asleep, David steals the nugget and heads toward San Francisco.  Jethro follows him and the two exchange gun fire.  As David tries to escape in a canoe, the two struggle and both are drowned.  To support her family, Thunder Heart Woman starts to sell food and supplies to the miners.

Meanwhile, Margaret Light Shines Wheeler has taken a job in a guest house in San Francisco, but continues to look for her father.  Jacob remained with the army, but became disillusioned at the treatment of Native Americans in Oregon and returned to trapping in the mountains in California.  After spotting an army unit sporting a Bear Flag, Margaret inquires if any of them know Jacob Wheeler.  A sergeant tells her that Jacob is among them and says he will lead her to him.   When the two enter a barn, he tries to rape her.  Margaret is saved by Ethan Biggs (Daniel Gillies), a British immigrant photographer.  Margaret goes to work for Biggs and the two eventually fall in love and marry.

While working in the photo studio, a local wheelwright tells Margaret a trapper in the mountains has fixed a broken wagon wheel for some settlers. Certain that it's her father, Margaret convinces Biggs to join her looking for the trapper's camp. When they find the camp, Jacob at first takes them for thieves and nearly shoots them.  Margaret shows him the wooden medicine wheel necklace and he realizes that she is his daughter.  Jacob then goes to Rancho Paradiso and is reunited with his family.

On the plains, white encroachment has become an undeniable problem for the tribes.  Running Fox and Dog Star join several other chiefs—including Conquering Bear (Graham Greene)—at the signing of the Treaty of Fort Laramie (1851).  All three agree that the peace is precarious but decide to give the agreement a chance.

A little later, Loved by the Buffalo is visiting Conquering Bear's village.  A cow escapes from a passing Mormon wagon train and rampages through the village, causing considerable damage.  The villagers try to give the cow back to the settlers, but they become frightened at the sight of the Indians and run away.  The tribe decides to keep the cow as compensation for the damage and butcher it.  Soldiers soon come, demanding that the cow be returned and the "thief" be handed over.  Conquering Bear tries to explain the situation to the soldiers but his efforts are thwarted by a drunken scout who intentionally mistranslates the negotiations.  The soldiers then open fire on the village and the warriors fight back.  Many are killed on both sides, including Conquering Bear. (Note: this event is based on the August 1854 Grattan massacre.)

A few years later, another Wheeler cousin, Samson Wheeler (Matthew Modine) has moved to Lawrence, Kansas with his family—his wife Susannah (Rebecca Jenkins), sons Aaron (Greyston Holt) and Jeremiah (James Kirk), and adopted daughter Clara (Rachael Leigh Cook).  An anti-slavery Unionist himself, Samson allies with the abolitionist Jayhawkers during the days of "Bleeding Kansas" as tensions rise in the months leading up to the Civil War.  He refuses to leave the town despite being threatened by Border Ruffian leader Bloody Bill Anderson (Christian Bocher) for hiring Henry Foster (Kwesi Ameyaw), a black worker.  Lawrence is later attacked by Anderson's bushwackers and Quantrill's Raiders.  In the raid, Samson, Susannah and their two sons are killed, leaving Clara as the only survivor.  She then leaves Kansas to seek out her cousins in Omaha, Nebraska.

Jacob Wheeler's sons take different paths.  Abe Wheeler (Christian Kane) has become a rider for the Pony Express.  Despite being an excellent rider, he loses his job when the Pony Express is superseded by the telegraph.  Jacob Wheeler, Jr. (Tyler Christopher) also decides to leave the family ranch to strike out on his own.  Leaving California for the great plains, his knowledge of the Lakota language is valuable to the army and he is hired as a scout.

Dog Star's son, Brings Horse (Nathaniel Arcand) is shot by an army sniper when he climbs a telegraph pole to investigate the wires strung from the top and cutting them.  Sleeping Bear (Nathan Lee Chasing His Horse), Dog Star's surviving son, pledges revenge against the whites for what they have done.

Episode 4: "Hell on Wheels" 
In December 1863, Clara Wheeler makes her journey to Omaha and finds her cousins, Daniel Wheeler (Lance Henriksen), his wife Esther (Jane E. Goold) and his children Robert (Warren Kole), Jackson (Glen Powell Jr.), Thomas (Kurt Sorenson) and Lilly (Mia Stallard). Daniel is pursuing the family trade as a wheelwright. He is not happy to see Clara (in the previous episode Samson mentioned that he never was on good terms with Daniel, although the reason is never revealed) and intends to send her away to the war-raged East, but he is persuaded by his wife and his son Robert to take Clara in, on the condition that Robert takes the sole responsibility for Clara.

The race is on as the Central Pacific and Union Pacific Railroads lay down tracks across the U.S., bringing East and West together.  Jacob Wheeler's son Abe joins the construction crew of the Central Pacific railroad, working east from Sacramento.  Working conditions are hard, and many workers leave to prospect for gold in the Californian goldfields.  Chinese workers ("Coolies") are brought in from San Francisco to supplement the work crews.   Abe meets and befriends Chow-Ping Yen (Garrett Wang), and they work in difficult conditions into and through the Sierra Nevada.  Chow-Ping saves Abe's life when he almost falls from a bosun's chair while setting dynamite to construct a shelf along a cliff face.

In March 1864, while photographing California Governor Frederick Low, Ethan Biggs and his wife, Margaret Light Shines (Jacob's daughter), decide to see the Indian Territory, and they take a stagecoach to Denver.  In Denver, they hear Colonel John Chivington (Tom Berenger) speak against the Indians and recruit for the Third Colorado Cavalry.  Ethan and Margaret's stagecoach is ambushed by Cheyenne warriors after leaving Denver.  The other passengers are killed, but they are captured by Roman Nose (Rod Rondeaux) and taken to the camp of Black Kettle.  Although the Cheyenne are hostile at first, Ethan and Margaret demonstrate their photographic equipment to the curious Cheyenne, and come to appreciate the Indian's hospitality.

While Ethan photographs the people of Black Kettle's camp, Margaret works to establish peace between the Cheyenne and the local Governor and Army. On September 28, 1864, Black Kettle holds council with Colorado Territory Governor John Evans, Colonel Chivington and Major Wynkoop (Arron Shiver), to ensure peace. (Major Wynkoop's character is based on Silas Soule.)  The Indians make clear their desire for peace, but the negotiations end inconclusively.

Margaret and Ethan decide to continue their journey, but, on November 29, 1864, the night before they have planned to leave, Colonel Chivington attacks Black Kettle's village at the head of the Third Colorado Cavalry. Most of the village, including Ethan, are killed at the Sand Creek Massacre. Margaret is saved by Black Kettle and flees with the survivors.

Further altercations between the Indians and the American settlers leads Red Cloud (Raoul Trujillo) to begin to gather the forces that will lead to Red Cloud's War. On December 21, 1866, a large band of Cheyenne and Sioux under Crazy Horse (Tatanka Means) attack a supply train near Fort Phil Kearny. Capt. Fetterman (Dylan Kenin) leads a relief party of 80 men. Ignoring orders not to venture beyond Lodge Trail Ridge, he led his troops into an ambush. He and his entire party were killed in the attack, later called the Fetterman Massacre.

General William Tecumseh Sherman meets with Black Kettle and other Indian Chiefs, and Margaret watches another treaty being signed. Despite the treaty, Col George Armstrong Custer (Jonathan Scarfe) and the 7th Cavalry attack Black Kettle's Cheyenne village at the Battle of Washita River on November 27, 1868.  Jacob Jr. has been serving as a scout for the U.S. Army with Custer. Margaret is taken captive with other Indian women. They are taken to an Army Fort, where she is reunited with her brother Jacob Jr., who tries to help her escape.  She refuses, insisting on staying with her adopted Indian family. Eventually, the U.S. Army abandons some forts, and the second Treaty of Fort Laramie creates the Great Sioux reservation.

Abe Wheeler continues to work on the railroad until the First transcontinental railroad was completed on May 10, 1869, when the driving of the Golden Spike joins the Union Pacific and Central Pacific Railroads at Promontory Summit in Utah. Abe parts company with Chow-Ping.

Meanwhile, Daniel Wheeler is seeking fortune by collaborating with Central Pacific Railroads and creating railroad boomtowns, exploiting the debaucheries of new settlers. He starts with North Platte, Nebraska with his sons Robert and Jackson as assistants, and by May 1868 they are in Cheyenne.  Robert brings Clara along, and romance develops between them, while Daniel strongly disapproves their relationship. Robert disagrees with Daniel's corruptive way of business, and grows distant from his father. After the Transcontinental Railroad is completed, Robert and Clara decide to strike out on their own, leaving behind the life dominated by the greedy Daniel.

Episode 5: "Casualties of War" 
Gold is discovered in the Black Hills in 1874. The Black Hills are considered by the Lakota to be the axis mundi, or center of the world, and the 1868 Treaty of Fort Laramie granted the Indians ownership of the mountain range. Now, settlers trespass on their land to prospect for gold, and the U.S. Army moves in to take possession. Conflict over control of the region sparks the Black Hills War, the last major Indian War on the Great Plains.

Red Cloud (Raoul Trujillo) continues to talk of peace with the whites at Pine Ridge Indian Reservation, but many young men leave to join Sitting Bull (Eric Schweig), including cousins White Bird (Kalani Queypo)—son of Sleeping Bear and grandson of Dog Star (Gil Birmingham)—and Red Lance (Eddie Spears)—grandson of Running Fox (Russell Means) and son of White Crow (David Midthunder). Red Lance's younger brother, Voices That Carry (Nakotah Larance), wants to go with his brother, but is required to stay behind with his grand-uncle Dog Star because of his youth. Red Cloud thinks that the "peace talkers" from Washington will honor the Treaty of Fort Laramie and keep other whites out of the Black Hills.

Robert Wheeler is operating a general store in Hillsgate, Dakota Territory, while Clara spends her spare time teaching the town's children. Their store prospers as a result of the Black Hills Gold Rush and the many who rush into the area to find gold. In October 1874, Robert agrees to take a prospector into the Black Hills for $10, but they are attacked by two bushwhackers and the prospector is killed. Robert kills the two bushwhackers in turn with his Sharps Buffalo Rifle. Though he is safely home, Clara is angry with Robert for risking his life to make money.  Clara buys a typewriter from a traveling salesman. Robert invests the profits from the store in about 100 Buffalo hides for $3 each, expecting to make a profit from the craze for buffalo bedspreads and overcoats, but finds that fashions have moved on and he cannot sell them to Douglas Hillman (Judge Reinhold) for more than $1 each. Instead, he gives them to the needy Indians at a nearby reservation.  While there, he meets Captain Richard Henry Pratt (Keith Carradine), who commends his actions.

Margaret Light Shines (Irene Bedard) has been a prisoner of the Army since the Battle of Washita River, but she finds purpose helping the women and orphaned children at the same Indian Reservation as Red Cloud. Voices That Carry runs away from the camp of Red Cloud to join his father, White Crow, with Sitting Bull.

In June 1876, Jacob Wheeler Jr. (Tyler Christopher) is still a scout for Lieutenant Colonel George Armstrong Custer (Jonathan Scarfe) and the 7th U.S. Cavalry. On the morning of the Battle of the Little Bighorn, Custer dispatches Jacob Jr. with a message to Captain Frederick Benteen. Jacob Jr. gives a letter for his parents to a friend who is assigned to Major Marcus Reno's group, in case he should not survive Custer's plan. As he foresaw, Jacob is killed before he finds Benteen, as Crazy Horse and a Lakota-Northern Cheyenne combined force wipe out Custer's cavalry detachment. Among those who are also killed is White Bird. Voices That Carry brings the body of his cousin back to Dog Star in Red Cloud's camp.

After the final letter from Jacob Jr. reaches them, Jacob (John Terry) and Thunder Heart Woman (Sheila Tousey) go to Hillsgate in an effort to find Jacob Jr.'s resting place. They meet Robert and Clara, who take them to the scene of the battle. It is then learnt that Robert and Clara had a son, William, who died from a fever. Clara is unable to let go of the painful memory and there is some strain in her relationship with Robert.

Following the defeat of the Sioux and their allies later in 1876, the United States "purchased" the Black Hills region (no actual purchase was ever completed and this area is under dispute to this day).

In 1879, Richard Henry Pratt returns to Hillsgate, and invites Robert and Clara to join him in teaching at an experimental school in Pennsylvania designed to "civilize" Native American children. Pratt persuades the Lakota that their children need to learn the white men's ways. He takes 125 Lakota children to the Carlisle Indian Industrial School in Carlisle, Pennsylvania. President Rutherford B. Hayes had arranged for the Carlisle Barracks to be made available. Among the children is Voices That Carry, who encourages the other Native Americans to resist assimilation. Voices That Carry's numerous attempts to undermine the process upset Pratt, but Robert tries to convince the boy to work hard so he can record the story of his people. Voices That Carry and Robert form a tentative friendship. After 6 months in Carlisle, Robert falls out with Pratt over his strict teaching methods, and heads back for home with Clara, who is now bearing their second child. Before they set off, Clara leaves her typewriter to Voices That Carry.

Episode 6: "Ghost Dance" 
Ten years have passed since the end of Episode 5.  Robert (Craig Sheffer) and Clara Wheeler (Joanna Going) return home, disillusioned by the school they have been hired to run, and Clara begins to teach Native American children on the reservation.  Loved by the Buffalo (Joseph M. Marshall III) believes he has found the foretold prophet when a mysterious Indian named Wovoka (Jonathan Joss) inspires his people with the Ghost Dance and a vision of their restored land at a Paiute reservation, the Yerington Indian Colony near Yerington, Nevada.  But the ritual stirs up more fear among those who wish to contain the Native Americans.  Voices That Carry (Chaske Spencer) is reunited with his brother Red Lance (Eddie Spears).  Within weeks, the Ghost Dance becomes a phenomenon in the reservation.  Local white governors and suppliers, who are tasked with the job of providing clothing and food for the Natives, become fearful of an Indian uprising.  Local newspaper reporters overly exaggerate the dance as being sadistic and rebellious in nature.  Margaret Light Shines is living in the reservation to help tend to the local children and sick.  One of the newspaper reporters, not realizing she speaks English and knows how to use a camera, confronts her and trades his camera for a Ghost Shirt.  Margaret Light Shines then uses the camera to record her version of the history.

After Sitting Bull is "accidentally" killed by Indian Police sent by the Indian Agent, the Ghost Dance rebellion grows, which in turn leads to more brutality toward the Native Americans.  Indian Agent Daniel Royer (David Paymer), fearful of the Ghost Dance, sends for help and Colonel James W. Forsyth arrives with the 7th Cavalry Regiment.  The 7th Cavalry regiment moves outward from the reservation into the hills and valleys restricted of Indian settlement where Big Foot (George Aguilar) and his followers are hiding out.  Fearful of the slaughter of his people who are poorly armed, Big Foot agrees to return to the reservation peacefully.

Jacob Wheeler (John Terry) and his wife Thunder Heart Woman (Sheila Tousey) decide to move to South Dakota to settle in with the people they care about—Robert and Clara.  Margaret Light Shines walks past and sees a missing person search notice (put up by Robert) and realizes her family is nearby.  She is taken back by Robert and reunites with her parents.

While on the journey back to the reservation settlement, the groups stop and rest at a valley called Wounded Knee.  While there, Colonel Forsyth requests Big Foot's men turn over all their weapons.  They do so peacefully; however, when Forsyth sees how few arms Big Foot's men are carrying, he becomes angry.  Believing his reports that Big Foot's men were well armed, the soldiers begin tearing apart the camp, taking anything that could be used as a weapon, including sticks and utensils.  One of Big Foot's warriors, Black Coyote (Tokala Clifford), is deaf and did not hear the request to turn in his gun.  When a U.S. soldier attempts to pry it from his hands, the gun goes off by accident.  The American soldiers then open fire at will upon Big Foot and his people.  While Big Foot's men rush to pick up their weapons and defend themselves, the women and children run in opposite directions only to be mowed down by the 7th Cavalry's gunfire.  Most of the Natives, including Big Foot, are slaughtered.  Robert Wheeler, who was attached to the 7th Cavalry in supplying Big Foot's men with blankets and food, survives the massacre but was injured by artillery.

The survivors of the massacre are marched back to the reservation.  Word goes round rapidly about the slaughter and Margaret Light Shines goes out to the field at Wounded Knee to photograph the massacre.  While there, she meets and photographs the newspaper reporter who sold her the camera, who is looking with horror at the sight of the hundreds of frozen dead bodies which he indirectly had contributed to.  She is also reunited with her uncle Loved By the Buffalo, who is performing the death rites for the deceased.  Margaret brings him to meet her parents, Thunder Heart Woman and Jacob Wheeler.

Loved By the Buffalo and Jacob Wheeler meet again, closing a circle that began many years ago, and Loved By the Buffalo comes to realize that his destiny was not to prevent what was destined to happen, but to preserve it and the memory of his people; to teach the young Lakota children the ways of their people.  "So long as there are still a few Lakota left who understand the traditional ways of their people, the tribe, history, and the memories and lessons of our past can still be preserved so that future generations may also learn from them."

The final scene shows Loved By the Buffalo sitting with a group of Lakota children, Margaret, and Thunder Heart Woman, teaching them the past of the people and his own experiences.  At the same time miles away, Robert and Clara are expecting another child.  Jacob is sitting on the porch with Robert and Clara's son Jedediah (Dax Ansley), telling him about his own experiences, past, and the lessons he has to teach.

 "The only history a man knows for certain is that small part he owns for himself."—Jacob Wheeler
 "I always told my children—you are one part Lakota and one part Virginia—be proud of both."—Jacob Wheeler
 "When you tell these stories, you touch the Grandmothers and Grandfathers."—Loved by the Buffalo

Cast
Listed below are the major characters and the actors who play them. Some of the characters are portrayed at different ages by different actors.

 Loved by the Buffalo: played by Chevez Ezaneh, Simon R. Baker, George Leach, Steve Reevis, Joseph M. Marshall III
 Thunder Heart Woman: played by Sarah Weston Tonantzin Carmelo, Sheila Tousey
 Running Fox: played by Mathew Strongeagle, Zahn McClarnon, Russell Means
 Dog Star: played by Pony Boy Osuniga, Michael Spears, Gil Birmingham
 Growling Bear: played by Gordon Tootoosis
 Jacob Wheeler: played by Matthew Settle, John Terry
 Jethro Wheeler: played by Skeet Ulrich
 Nathan Wheeler: played by Alan Tudyk
 Jedediah Smith: played by Josh Brolin
 James Fletcher: played by Will Patton
 Johnny Fox: played by Gary Busey
 Naomi Wheeler: played by Keri Russell
 Rachel Wheeler: played by Jessica Capshaw
 Leah Wheeler: played by Emily Holmes
 Stephen Hoxie: played by Beau Bridges
 Preacher Hobbes: played by Derek de Lint
 Prairie Fire: played by Jay Tavare
 Margaret (Light Shines) Wheeler: played by Chantry Bruised Head, Summer Rae Birdyellowhead, Sage Galesi, Irene Bedard
 Jacob (Touch the Sky) Wheeler Jr.: played by Samuel Patrick Chu, Tyler Christopher
 Abraham (High Wolf) Wheeler: played by Benjamin Smoke, Tyler Posey, Christian Kane
 Conquering Bear: played by Graham Greene
 Clara Wheeler: played by Rachael Leigh Cook, Joanna Going
 David Wheeler: played by Balthazar Getty
 Samson Wheeler: played by Matthew Modine
 Martin Jarrett: played by Sean Astin
 Ethan Biggs: played by Daniel Gillies
 Robert Wheeler: played by Warren Kole, Craig Sheffer
 Daniel Wheeler: played by Lance Henriksen
 John Chivington: played by Tom Berenger
 George Armstrong Custer: played by Jonathan Scarfe
 Thomas C. Durant: played by Forrest Fyre
 Black Kettle: played by Wes Studi
 Red Cloud: played by Raoul Trujillo
 White Crow: played by William Joseph Elk III, David Midthunder
 Red Lance: played by Malachi Tsoodle-Nelson, Eddie Spears
 Richard Henry Pratt: played by Keith Carradine
 Douglas Hillman: played by Judge Reinhold
 Sitting Bull: played by Eric Schweig
 Crazy Horse: played by Tatanka Means
 Voices That Carry: played by Nakotah LaRance, Chaske Spencer
 Daniel Royer: played by David Paymer
 Yellow Bird: played by Billy Merasty
 Kicking Bear: played by Brandon Oakes
 Spotted Elk: played by George Aguilar
 Sleeping Bear: played by Nathan Lee Chasing His Horse

Wheeler family tree
Sources:

Accolades

Home release
A four disc DVD box set was released on October 4, 2005. There are producer, director, and cast interviews among the six episodes of the series and other various features.

Soundtrack
A two-disc album of Geoff Zanelli's music was released in 2013 by La-La Land Records.

Notes

References

External links
 Into the West official TNT site
 

2005 American television series debuts
2005 American television series endings
2000s American television miniseries
English-language television shows
Television series by DreamWorks Television
Television shows filmed in Alberta
Television shows filmed in New Mexico
TNT (American TV network) original programming
2000s Western (genre) television series
Cultural depictions of Sitting Bull
Cultural depictions of Crazy Horse
Cultural depictions of George Armstrong Custer
Television shows about Native Americans